Pisgah, Ceredigion is a hamlet in the  community of Melindwr, Ceredigion, Wales, which is 70.2 miles (113 km) from Cardiff and 173.3 miles (278.8 km) from London. Pisgah is represented in the Senedd by Elin Jones (Plaid Cymru) and the Member of Parliament is Ben Lake (Plaid Cymru).

References

See also
Pisgah (disambiguation)
List of localities in Wales by population 

Villages in Ceredigion